Go Radio Glasgow is a commercial digital audio broadcasting station based in Glasgow, Scotland. It broadcasts to Glasgow and Central Scotland on the Switch Scotland DAB Mux. It launched on 17 July 2018, and re-launched on Friday 17 April 2020.

Programming 
All programming is produced and broadcast from Go Radio studios in Glasgow. The station broadcasts live shows daily between 6am and midnight.

The station's weekday presenters include Gary Muricroft and Grado (wrestler) (Go radio breakfast with Crofty and Grado), Gary Marshall (Go Radio No - repeat workday), Gina Mckie (Drive), Joe Kilday (Evenings).

Between 9am and 5pm the station doesn't repeat a song under the No repeat workday.

The weekend line up includes Dance music shows with Stevie Lennon  and a business show ' The GO Radio Business Show with Hunter & Haughey'  with Tom Hunter and Willie Haughey.

News and sport 
Sports coverage airs under as the GO radio football show and includes live match reports during the season and a magazine show /phone in on weekday evenings. It is presented by Paul Cooney and Rob MacLean  and features regular panellists Barry Ferguson and John Hartson.

References

English-language radio stations
Radio stations in Glasgow